The 2022 Wisconsin Secretary of State election took place on November 8, 2022, to elect the Secretary of State of Wisconsin. Incumbent Democrat Doug La Follette won re-election to an unprecedented 12th term in the office, narrowly defeating Republican state legislator Amy Loudenbeck.

Democratic primary

Candidates

Nominee
Doug La Follette, incumbent secretary of state

Eliminated in primary
Alexia Sabor, chair of the Dane County Democratic Party

Endorsements

Polling

Results

Republican primary

Candidates

Nominee
Amy Loudenbeck, state assemblywoman

Eliminated in primary
Daniel Schmidtka
Jay Schroeder, nominee for secretary of state in 2018

Withdrew before primary
Dmitry Becker

Endorsements

Results

Libertarian primary

Candidates

Nominee
Neil Harmon

Results

General election

Predictions

Polling

Results

Notes

Partisan clients

References

External links
Official campaign websites
Doug La Follette (D) for Secretary of State
Amy Loudenbeck (R) for Secretary of State

Secretary of State
Wisconsin
Wisconsin Secretary of State elections